The Nightingale is a 1936 Soviet drama film directed by Nikolai Ekk and starring Valentina Ivashova, Z. Kashkarova and Nikolai Ekk.

The film's sets were designed by the art director Ivan Stepanov.

It is the first Soviet feature film shot in color.

Plot
The events in the film take place in pre-revolutionary Russia. A riot of workers of a large porcelain factory is taking place. After the burning of one of the shops, Grunya's father dies in the fire. The owner of the factory caused the fire in order to obtain a fine from the workers. Grunya urges the workers to fight, but is injured, yet she still urges the people not to give up.

Cast
 Valentina Ivashova as Grunya Kornakova  
 Z. Kashkarova as Grunya's Mother  
 Nikolai Ekk as Uncle Andrei  
 A. Kosanov as Foreman  
 Ivan Lavrov as Grunya's Father  
 Mikhail Doronin as M. Novostalano  
 Vladimir Batalov as N. Luznetsov  
 G. Yegorova as His Wife  
 M. Skavronskaya
 Yelena Maksimova 
 Vera Lopatina 
 A.I. Vasilyeva  
 A. Ignatyeva 
 L. Tisse

See also
 List of early color feature films

References

Bibliography
 Liz-Anne Bawden (ed.) The Oxford Companion to Film. Oxford University Press, 1976.

External links 
 

1936 films
1930s color films
1936 drama films
Soviet drama films
1930s Russian-language films